Shaqlawa District is a district in the Erbil Governorate, Iraq. This district encompasses three sub-districts Hiran, Salahaddin and Harir, and 210 villages. It lies 50 km from the city of Erbil.

References

Districts of Erbil Governorate